Orange Free State Command was a command of the South African Army, active from  to . 
Its headquarters was at Bloemfontein, seemingly for a period at the Tempe airfield, later to become the Tempe Military Base.

History

Origin

Union Defence Force Military Districts
The command was originally Military District No. 4, formed in 1926. In 19331934 it became Orange Free State Command, and then may have become Central Command around 1939.The Officers commanding the new Commands were usually Brigadiers all units in those areas fell under them as far as training, housing, administration , discipline and counter insurgency was concerned.

Dan Pienaar served as officer commanding from 4 January 1935 to January 1937, before being transferred to take command of the Roberts' Heights and Transvaal Command at Voortrekkerhoogte which he commanded from 17 October 1938 to May 1940.

On 3 September 1939 the command included the 4th Infantry Brigade (including Regiment President Steyn, RLW, Regiment de Wet, and 4 Field Company SAEC, a pioneer battalion, and an artillery regiment, the Orange Free State Field Artillery (O.V.S. Veld Artillerie in Afrikaans). The OVSVA may have later become the Orange Free State Artillery, and later, in turn, 6 Field Regiment South African Artillery.

In 1959 the Command was renamed back to Orange Free State Command. Later Brig Pieter Grobbelaar commanded. In April 1978 44 Parachute Brigade was formed within its command boundaries and Brigadier M. J. du Plessis, OC OFS Command, took over as the brigade commander.

SADF
In 1984 the command was reported to include:
 2 Field Engineer Regiment SAEC (Bethlehem, Free State) 
 17 Field Squadron SAEC (Bethlehem, Free State) 
 35 Engineering Supplementary Unit (Kroonstad) 
 Tank Squadron, 1 Special Service Battalion (Bloemfontein) 
 1 South African Infantry (Bloemfontein) 
 1 Parachute Battalion (Bloemfontein) 
 3 Military Hospital (Bloemfontein)

Around 1991 44 Parachute Brigade was subordinated to OFS Command. McGill Alexander writes that: "… The status of
being an independent formation consequently disappeared, and from being directly under command of Chief of the Army [44 Parachute Brigade] fell into the position of having three bosses: the Officer Commanding Rapid Deployment Force for conventional operations and exercises, Director of Operations at Army HQ for routine and unscheduled deployments inside the country and the Officer Commanding OFS
Command for everything else."

Brigadier Reginald Otto served as officer commanding OFS Command, and later became Chief of the South African Army.

On 7 October 1999, the acting General Officer Commanding OFS Command, Brigadier General Hans Heinze, denied the existence of racial tensions at Tempe Military Base.

Groups and Commando Units

Group 24 (Kroonstad) 
 Frankfort Commando
 Heilbron Commando
 Hoopstad Commando
 Koppies Commando
 Kroonstad Commando
 Lindley Commando
 Parys Commando
 Sasol Commando
 Sasolburg Commando
 Senekal Commando
 Virginia Commando
 Vrede Commando

Group 25 (Bethlehem) 
 Bethlehem Commando
 Harrismith Commando
 Reitz Commando

Group 26 
 Jacobsdal Commando
 Phillipolis Commando
 Winburg Commando
 Zastron Commando

Group 34 (Welkom) 
 Bothaville Commando
 Bultfontein Commando
 Odendaalsrus Commando
 Sanrivier Commando, Henneman
 Theunissen Commando
 Goldfields Commando

Group 35 (Bloemfontein) 
 Bloemfontein City Commando
 Bloemfontein District Commando
 Brandfort Commando
 Edenburg Commando
 Ficksburg Commando
 Rouxville Commando
 Smithfield Commando
 University OFS Commando
 Wepener Commando
 Fouriesburg Commando

Group 36 (Ladybrand) 
 Caledon River Commando
 Fauriesmith Commando
 Ladybrand Commando
 Senekal Commando

Leadership

Further reading

References

Commands of the South African Army
Disbanded military units and formations in Bloemfontein
Military units and formations established in the 1930s
Military units and formations disestablished in the 1990s